The Shaheed Benazir Bhutto Dewan University (SBBDU) is a private university located in Karachi, Sindh, Pakistan. The university was established in 2013 It is recognized by the Higher Education Commission (Pakistan). SBBDU is a part of Yousuf Dewan Companies.

Programs
 DPT
 PPDPT
 BBA
 ADP(Business Administration)
 BEd
 BSCS
 PharmD
 MSCS
 MEd
 MBA
 Executive MBA
 PhD Management Sciences
 PhD Health Management

References

External links 
 SBBDU official website

Educational institutions established in 2013
2013 establishments in Pakistan
Private universities and colleges in Sindh
Universities and colleges in Karachi
Memorials to Benazir Bhutto